Raúl Sáenz del Rincón (born 3 August 1976), known as Raúl Llona or just Llona, is a Spanish retired footballer who played as a midfielder, and the current manager of SD Logroñés.

Playing career
Born in Logroño, La Rioja, Llona started his career with CD Berceo before moving to CD Logroñés in 1995. On 22 June 1997, after two seasons as a starter with the reserves, he made his professional debut by playing the last 13 minutes of a 1–2 La Liga away loss against Real Sociedad.

Llona would spend the remainder of his career mainly in Segunda División B, representing CD Manchego, CD Mensajero, Talavera CF, Real Unión and CD Calahorra in that category. He also enjoyed two further spells with his first club Logroñés, with the side mainly in Tercera División, and retired with the side in 2007 at the age of 31.

Managerial career
Immediately after retiring Llona took up coaching, managing Peña Balsamaiso CF's youth setup. In 2009, he returned to his first club Berceo, taking over the Juvenil squad while also working as a director of football.

In March 2013, Llona was appointed manager of UD Logroñés in the third division. On 6 June 2014, he took over neighbouring SD Logroñés, recently relegated to the fourth division.

On 23 June 2016, Llona was named in charge of fellow fourth tier club CD Anguiano. On 13 July of the following year, he joined Deportivo Alavés as manager of the Cadete B squad. 

Llona was named Club San Ignacio manager in 2018, subsequently helping in their promotion to the fourth level. On 19 May 2020, he renewed as manager of San Ignacio until June 2022.

On 9 February 2021, Llona was appointed manager of Alavés' B-team, but was sacked exactly two months later. On 27 May, he returned to SD Logroñés, with the club now in Primera División RFEF.

References

External links

1976 births
Living people
Sportspeople from Logroño
Spanish footballers
Footballers from La Rioja (Spain)
Association football midfielders
La Liga players
Segunda División B players
Tercera División players
CD Logroñés footballers
CD Mensajero players
Real Unión footballers
CD Calahorra players
Spanish football managers
Primera Federación managers
Segunda División B managers
Tercera División managers
UD Logroñés managers